Ray Shuey Wetmore (September 30, 1923 – February 14, 1951) was a quadruple ace of United States Army Air Forces over Europe during World War II. He was credited with 21.25 victories in aerial combat. He was killed in an accidental crash of an F-86 at or near Otis Air Force Base.

Early life
Born in Kerman, California, Wetmore enlisted in the U.S. Army Air Corps as an armament specialist on November 24, 1941, entered the Aviation Cadet Program on July 3, 1942, and was commissioned a 2d Lt and awarded his pilot wings on March 20, 1943.

Military career

World War II

Upon commissioning in March 1943 he joined the new 359th Fighter Group which was sent to England in October that year. Flying with the 370th Fighter Squadron, in February and March 1944 Wetmore scored his first 4.25 victories flying the Republic P-47 Thunderbolt.

After retraining to fly a North American P-51 Mustang, Wetmore achieved the title of ace, shooting down two Bf 109s on May 19, 1944. He flew an aircraft bearing the legend "Daddy's Girl". There were several planes with this title in the 359th Fighter Group at that time. All of Wetmore's fighters – a P-47D, a P-51B and a P-51D – bore this name. By the end of May 1944, the number of Wetmore's victories had reached 8.25. In a little over a year of military activities, Wetmore had shot down 15 enemy aircraft and been promoted to the rank of captain.

The two tours of duty that Wetmore served made him a witness to the downfall of the Luftwaffe. On November 27, 1944, Wetmore and Lieutenant Р. York engaged in a skirmish with almost a hundred Bf.109 fighters to the north of Munster. As Wetmore himself said later: "To defend ourselves, we had to attack." Three Messerschmitts were shot down in the battle. The Americans escaped the battle without losses.

Wetmore's next success was on February 14, 1945, when he shot down three Fw 190s in one day not far from the Dümmer lake airfield. His wingman took down a fourth enemy plane. In total on that day, the entire 359th Fighter Group recorded 4.5 victories. Wetmore achieved his last victory on March 15, 1945, near Wittenberg, destroying an Ме-163 rocket fighter. While he was chasing the Me 163, the air speed indicator on Wetmore's P-51D showed 600 miles per hour. In total, Wetmore completed around 142 combat flights throughout World War II. His final score was 21.25 destroyed, one damaged in aerial combat and 2.33 ground victories. It is the highest score in the 359th Fighter Group and eighth best of all American flying aces in the European Theater. On VE Day, he was a 21-year-old major.

Post war
After the war, Wetmore served with the 1st Fighter Group at March Field from December 1945 to November 1946. After attending Officer's Electronics School, he was assigned as Operations Officer with the 37th Fighter Squadron of 14th Fighter Group at Dow Air Force Base, from October 1947 to March 1949.

Wetmore was next assigned to 1st Air Force, where he served from March 1949 to December 1950. His final assignment was as Commander of the 59th Fighter-Interceptor Squadron of 33rd Fighter-Interceptor Group at Otis Air Force Base

Death
As a major, Wetmore commanded the 59th Fighter-Interceptor Squadron at Otis Air Force Base, Massachusetts.

On February 14, 1951, Wetmore took off from Los Angeles in an F-86 Sabre on a trip to Otis. When he was on his final approach, his plane suddenly shot up skyward, and then turned towards the ground where it crashed. Wetmore was killed instantly. He was reported to have said that he could not slow the plane or eject. He was also reported to have said to the tower that, "I'm going to go up and bring it down in Wakeby Lake, so I don't hit any houses." When he died, he left a widow and four children.

Awards and decorations
His military decorations include:

In popular culture
His P-51D-10 flown during World War II is featured in War Thunder as a premium aircraft.

Notes
Dr. Frank Olynyk (1995).  Stars & Bars: A Tribute to the American Fighter Ace 1920–1973.  Grub Street, London.
Lt. John F. McAlevey (March, 1971. Encounter at Remagen: U.S. Air Ace's Brush with Death'', Veterans of Foreign Wars Magazine, pp. 26–27,32)

References

External links

http://www.johnfmcalevey.com/ww2/remagen.htm
https://www.youtube.com/watch?v=l075YAuuqek
http://www.midwestaero.com/articles/daddysgirl.pdf
http://valor.militarytimes.com/recipient.php?recipientid=23141
https://www.facebook.com/#!/notes/359th-fighter-group-1943-1945/me-163-encounter-report-15-march-1945/154403034622430

1923 births
1951 deaths
Accidental deaths in Massachusetts
American World War II flying aces
Aviators from California
Aviators killed in aviation accidents or incidents in the United States
Recipients of the Air Medal
Recipients of the Distinguished Flying Cross (United States)
Recipients of the Distinguished Service Cross (United States)
Recipients of the Silver Star
United States Air Force officers
United States Army Air Forces officers
United States Army Air Forces pilots of World War II
Victims of aviation accidents or incidents in 1951